Ebertplatz is the largest underground station on the Cologne Stadtbahn, and is served by lines 12, 15, 16 and 18. The station lies at Ebertplatz on the Cologne Ring in the district of Innenstadt.

History 
The station was opened in 1974 and consists of a mezzanine and two island platforms with four rail tracks. From the beginning it was built to efficiently handle large passenger volumes, as it features no at-grade crossings like some previous underground stations. Before 2008, the station also offered two side platforms on the outer tracks, so passengers could board and leave on both sides. This was due to the fact that the station was also used by single ended tram cars, so each track had to have a platform on the right. To gain accessibility, the platforms for the trains from and to Dom/Hbf had to be elevated, as high-floor cars operate on this route. However, the other tracks, leading to the Ringe tunnel, are, only used by low-floor cars, so the island platforms were split in the middle into a low and a high side. Therefore, the platforms were widened, using the space by the former outer platforms which thus were removed.

On 8th of October 2022, a train of line 18 caught fire while standing at the station. During the incident 6 people were injured, and operations had to be stopped for several hours.

Notable places nearby 
 Eigelsteintor
 Neusser Straße
 Theodor-Heuss-Ring
 Bastei

See also 
 List of Cologne KVB stations

References

External links 
 
 station info page 
 station diagram map by Verkehrsverbund Rhein-Sieg 

Cologne KVB stations
Innenstadt, Cologne
Railway stations in Germany opened in 1974
Cologne-Bonn Stadtbahn stations